The self is an individual person as the object of his or her own reflective consciousness.

Self may also refer to:

Arts
 Self (album), by Quintessence
 Self (band), an American alternative rock band
 Self (novel), a 1996 Canadian novel
 Self (sculpture), an ongoing art project
 Self Incorporated, a 1975 instructional television series on PBS
 Self, an album by Paul Kalkbrenner
 "Self", a song by Zager & Evans from the album 2525 (Exordium & Terminus)

Technology and science
 Self (company), a Swedish motor vehicle manufacturer
 self (computer science), a keyword in many object-oriented programming languages
 Self (programming language), an object-oriented programming language based on the concept of prototypes
 Solar Electric Light Fund (SELF), an international development aid organization

Other uses
Psychology of self
 Self (magazine), an American women's magazine
 Self (surname), a surname
 Self, Arkansas, an unincorporated community

See also 
 Selves (disambiguation)
 Virtual self (disambiguation)